Makarius Fredik Suruan (born 8 April 1995), is an Indonesian professional footballer who plays as a defensive midfielder or right-back for Liga 2 club Persewar Waropen.

Club career

Perseru Serui
In 2017, Makarius signed a year contract with Indonesian Liga 1 club Perseru Serui. He made his league debut on 3 September 2017 in a match against Barito Putera at the Marora Stadium, Yapen.

Borneo
He was signed for Borneo to play in Liga 1 in the 2019 season. Makarius made his league debut on 3 July 2019 in a match against Kalteng Putra at the Tuah Pahoe Stadium, Palangkaraya.

RANS Cilegon
In 2021, Makarius signed a contract with Indonesian Liga 2 club RANS Cilegon. He made his league debut on 28 September against Dewa United at the Gelora Bung Karno Madya Stadium, Jakarta.

International career
In 2014, Makarius represented the Indonesia U-19, in the 2014 AFF U-19 Youth Championship.

Career statistics

Club

Honours

Club
RANS Cilegon
 Liga 2 runner-up: 2021

References

External links
 Makarius Suruan at Soccerway
 Makarius Suruan at Liga Indonesia

1995 births
Living people
Papuan people
People from Manokwari
Perseru Serui players
Borneo F.C. players
RANS Nusantara F.C. players
Persewar Waropen players
Liga 1 (Indonesia) players
Liga 2 (Indonesia) players
Indonesia youth international footballers
Indonesian footballers
Association football midfielders
Sportspeople from Papua